Francisco Fernández de la Cueva y Girón, 4th Duke of Alburquerque (in full) (c. 1510 – 1563) was a Spanish nobleman.

He was the son of Don Beltrán de la Cueva, 3rd Duke of Alburquerque and of Doña Isabel Girón. He fought in Africa and participated in the siege at La Goletta and the Conquest of Tunis in 1535.

He married Doña Constanza de Leiva, daughter of the principe di Ascoli, and later (1549) Doña María Fernández de la Córdoba, daughter of Luis Fernández de Córdoba, 2nd Marquis of Comares.

Sources

1510 births
1563 deaths
104
Marquesses of Cuellar
Counts of Ledesma
Counts of Huelma
Fernández de la Cueva